Rohan Belekar (born 27 October 1987) is an Indian first-class cricketer who plays for Goa. He made his first-class debut for Goa in the 2012–13 Ranji Trophy on 29 December 2012.

References

External links
 

1987 births
Living people
Indian cricketers
Goa cricketers